Dish TV Sri Lanka was a  pay TV satellite provider based in Sri Lanka. A fully owned subsidiary of DishTV India, Dish TV Sri Lanka was launched in 2015. However, the company ceased its operations in Sri Lanka due to heavy losses in 2019. Few channels were aired as Free To Air after disputes raised by its users for the sudden shutdown of services until July 2020 when the service was completely shutdown.

See also
Dialog TV
List of television networks in Sri Lanka

References

Direct broadcast satellite services
Television in Sri Lanka